Digital embossing is a digital printing technology, designed to revolutionize the enhancement process in the printing industry.  Digital embossing eliminates the need for printing plates, molds, chemicals, and solvents, emitting no pollutants or waste and reduces overall energy use. The high resolution inkjet technology enables selective coating with variable thickness and stampless embossing. Digital embossing allows for on-demand printing of as few as one item to thousands of copies.

Digital embossing was invented by Scodix, an Israel-based startup company that produces equipment for print enhancement applications in the commercial and packaging industries. Digital embossing enhancement technology was first unveiled at IPEX 2010 on the Scodix1200™ UV DigitalEmbossing™ press.

Digital embossing can be specified by different print modes.

Preparation
The preparation for digital embossing is not easy. An additional black separation with image in all the areas intended for digital embossing is needed. Because of the exceptional accuracy of the process (each sheet is registered optically before printing) the most complex shapes can be embossed.

Production time
Digital embossing generally adds about two minutes to the production time.

See also
 Embossing

References

External links
 Visutech to distribute first digital UV embossing press in Nordic Countries - WhatTheyThink, PR, 14 April 2010
 Richard Romano, "Could Happy Days Be Here Again? Optimism at Ipex Portends Potential Industry Renaissance", 20 May 2010
PodCs - Free POD Upload Tool & Trends Niches Research Print On Demand Upload Automation Platform, 1 April 2022

Digital press
Printing processes